Keraea garachicoensis is an extinct species of air-breathing land snail, a terrestrial pulmonate gastropod mollusk in the family Discidae or Endodontidae.

Keraea garachicoensis is considered to be extinct.

Distribution 
This species was endemic to Tenerife, Canary Islands.

References

Endemic fauna of the Canary Islands
Discidae
Endodontidae
Extinct gastropods
Gastropods described in 1878